Eretmocera typhonica is a moth of the family Scythrididae. It was described by Edward Meyrick in 1917. It is found in Cameroon and Côte d'Ivoire.

The wingspan is about 12 mm. The forewings are deep purple, with blue-green reflections. The hindwings are dark bronzy-fuscous, but lighter anteriorly.

References

typhonica
Moths described in 1917